Strictispira drangai is a species of small sea snail, a marine gastropod mollusk in the family Pseudomelatomidae.

Description
The length of the shell varies between 14 mm and 20 mm.

Distribution
This marine species occurs off West Florida, the Bahamas, the Greater Antilles, Saint Thomas, U.S. Virgin Islands and Barbados.

References

 Schwengel, J. S., 1951, New marine mollusks from British West Indies and Florida Keys. The Nautilus, 64(4): 116-119, pl. 8

External links
 
 Donn L. Tippett, The genus Strictispira in the western Atlantic (Gastropoda: Conoidea), Malacologia 48 (2006)
 Gastropods.com: Strictispira drangai

drangai
Gastropods described in 1951